"So Good" is a song by American singer, Dove Cameron. It was released through Disruptor and Columbia Records on November 1, 2019. The release marks Cameron's third track since launching her music career back in September.

Background 
In an interview with Entertainment Tonight, Dove Cameron stated that the track was "one of [her] favorite songs that [she's] done". Cameron also described the song as a "feel good track with an edge".

Critical reception 

Mike Nied from Idolator wrote that "There's something so euphoric about how she wholeheartedly embraces the feel-good vibes that is bound to speak to listeners", and that the song was "Relatable and gorgeously produced".

Music video 
The music video for the song was released on the same day as the track. The video displays Cameron on a rotating platform for the duration of the video, while Cameron is decorated in a variety of flowers using prosthetic glue. As the video progresses, each look builds off of one another as Cameron is covered in more florals.

In February 2022, this music video was deleted from her YouTube channel, along with all other songs Cameron had released prior to Boyfriend.

Reception 
Writing for Entertainment Tonight, Zach Seemayer described the video as "mature, ethereal and surreal".

Appearances 
The song makes an appearance in the 2020 film After We Collided. Another song of Cameron's, "We Belong", was used for the film's trailer.

Release history

References 

2019 songs
2019 singles
Columbia Records singles
Disruptor Records singles
Dove Cameron songs
Songs written by Ariel Rechtshaid
Songs written by Dove Cameron
Songs written by Julia Michaels
Songs written by Justin Tranter